The Franklin Ward is the southernmost ward on the Auckland Council. The Franklin ward has one local board, also called Franklin; the Franklin Local Board has three subdivisions - Wairoa, Pukekohe and Waiuku. Franklin is currently represented by Andy Baker.

Demographics

Franklin ward had a population of 74,838 at the 2018 New Zealand census, an increase of 9,519 people (14.6%) since the 2013 census, and an increase of 16,233 people (27.7%) since the 2006 census. There were 25,359 households, comprising 37,155 males and 37,683 females, giving a sex ratio of 0.99 males per female. The median age was 40.5 years (compared with 37.4 years nationally), with 15,765 people (21.1%) aged under 15 years, 12,882 (17.2%) aged 15 to 29, 34,896 (46.6%) aged 30 to 64, and 11,295 (15.1%) aged 65 or older.

Ethnicities were 82.0% European/Pākehā, 15.0% Māori, 5.4% Pacific peoples, 8.5% Asian, and 2.1% other ethnicities. People may identify with more than one ethnicity.

The percentage of people born overseas was 22.3, compared with 27.1% nationally.

Although some people chose not to answer the census's question about religious affiliation, 51.9% had no religion, 35.2% were Christian, 0.9% had Māori religious beliefs, 1.6% were Hindu, 0.7% were Muslim, 0.5% were Buddhist and 2.4% had other religions.

Of those at least 15 years old, 11,064 (18.7%) people had a bachelor's or higher degree, and 10,431 (17.7%) people had no formal qualifications. The median income was $38,200, compared with $31,800 nationally. 14,364 people (24.3%) earned over $70,000 compared to 17.2% nationally. The employment status of those at least 15 was that 31,635 (53.6%) people were employed full-time, 8,706 (14.7%) were part-time, and 1,941 (3.3%) were unemployed.

Councillors

Election Results 
Election Results for the Franklin Ward:

2022 Election Results

References

External links 
Council description of Franklin Ward

Wards of the Auckland Region